Myioscaptia muscula is a large horse fly native to Australia.

Ecology
The larva of Scaptia muscula lives in the pit trap of an antlion larva and feeds on the prey that it catches.

References

Tabanidae
Insects described in 1955
Diptera of Australasia